Brian Molloy was a member of the Irish Republican Army, fl. 1916-1921

Molloy, along with Michael Newell, was described as "... a born leader ... was the guide and motivator of the Castlegar Company in the 1916 rising and later in the War of Independence." He had been captured in the aftermath of the Easter Rising and sentenced to death. This was subsequently commuted to ten years' penal servitude, but he was released in June 1917.

He planned many of the ambushes in the locality of the town of Galway. His family home was burned to the ground by the Black and Tans.

See also
 Tom Ruane
 Joe Howley
 Larry Lardner

References
 History of Castlegar Parish, Padraic Ó Laoi, 1996.

People from County Galway
Irish Republican Army (1919–1922) members
Year of birth missing
Year of death missing